FNV Kunsten Informatie en Media v Staat der Nederlanden (2014) C-413/13 is a European labour law case, concerning European competition law.

Facts
A Dutch trade union for orchestra substitute workers, the Arts, Information and Media Union (FNV Kunsten Informatie en Media, "FNV"), claimed that it was not subject to competition law as the Nederlandse Mededingingsautoriteit (Netherlands Competition Authority) had claimed was possible in a "reflection document". The orchestra workers were covered by a collective agreement that FNV had entered into.

Judgment
The Court of Justice, First Chamber, held that agreements entered into by self-employed workers could be subject to article 101(1) as self-employed people could in principle be classified as undertakings, but not in any case where workers were "false self-employed" either in contract terms or for tax purposes.

See also

United Kingdom labour law
European competition law

Notes

References
E McGaughey, A Casebook on Labour Law (Hart 2019) ch 10, 450

External links
AG Wahl Opinion

Court of Justice of the European Union case law
United Kingdom labour case law